is a district located in Fukuoka Prefecture, Japan.

As of 2006, the district has an estimated population of 14,648 and a density of 729.85 persons per km2. The total area is 20.07 km2.

Towns and villages
Keisen

Mergers
On March 26, 2006 the towns of Chikuho, Honami, Kaita and Shōnai merged with the former city of Iizuka to form the new city, also called Iizuka.
On March 27, 2006 the towns of Inatsuki, Kaho and Usui merged with the old city of Yamada to form the new city of Kama.

Districts in Fukuoka Prefecture